Luigi Annoni (9 November 1890 – 17 April 1974) was an Italian racing cyclist. He won stages 6 and 8 of the 1921 Giro d'Italia and stage 8 of the 1922 Giro d'Italia.

Major results
1913
4th Giro di Lombardia
1921
1st Stages 6 & 8 Giro d'Italia
1922
1st Stage 8 Giro d'Italia
10th Milan–San Remo

References

External links
 

1890 births
1974 deaths
Italian male cyclists
Italian Giro d'Italia stage winners
Cyclists from the Metropolitan City of Milan